Kache Aye Shoi (English: Come Close Shoi) was a Bengali television serial. It used to air on Zee Bangla.

Cast 
 Chandni Saha as Shoi
 Mimi Dutta as Brishti
 Priyam as Ujaan Roy Chowdhury
 Gourab Roy Chowdhury as Roop
 Bhaswar Chatterjee as Tiyash
 Rupsha Chakraborty as Raahi
 Ratna Ghoshal as Shoi's grandmother 
 Shaon Dey as Shampa
 Pushpita Mukherjee as Mithu
 Sanghamitra Talukdar as Rinku
 Subhadra Mukherjee as Roop's mother
 Debika Mitra as Ujaan's mother
 Bhaskar Banerjee as Ashok
 Rita Dutta Chakraborty as Moni ma
 Nabanita Dutta as Panna
 Sucheta Chakraborty as Bristi's mother
 Sanjib Sarkar as Bristi's father
 Bhavana Banerjee as Tupshi
 Joyjit Banerjee as Suraj
 Shankar Chakraborty as Shankar
 Ritoja Majumder as Ashok's wife
 Debraj Mukherjee as Shoi's late father

References

External links
 Website at ZEE5

Zee Bangla original programming
2010 Indian television series debuts